Orphée (Q163) was a French Navy  commissioned in 1933. During World War II, she operated on the Allied side until 1940, when she became part of the naval forces of Vichy France. In 1942 she joined the Free French Naval Forces. She was condemned in 1946.

Construction and commissioning
Orphée was ordered in 1928 as part of Naval Program 115. Her construction began on 18 December 1928, and her keel was laid down at Augustin Normand in Le Havre, France, on 22 August 1929. She was launched on 10 November 1931. After fitting out, she was commissioned for trials on 1 February 1932. Her official trials began on 16 April 1932, and her final equipping and armament took place at Cherbourg, France, from 31 December 1932 to 15 March 1933. She was placed in full commission on 8 June 1933.

Service history

Pre-World War II

On 23 May 1933, Orphée lost a crewman.

On 28 November 1934, the submarine  got underway from Cherbourg to conduct exercises with Orphée and Orphée′s sister ship .

World War II

French Navy
France entered the war on the side of the Allies on 3 September 1939.

German ground forces advanced into France on 10 May 1940, beginning the Battle of France, and Italy declared war on France on 10 June 1940 and joined the invasion. The Battle of France ended in France's defeat and an armistice with Germany and Italy on 22 June 1940. When the armistice when into effect on 25 June 1940, Orphée was based at Casablanca in French Morocco.

Vichy France

After France′s surrender, Orphée served in the naval forces of Vichy France. On 3 July 1940, the British began Operation Catapult, which sought to seize or neutralize the ships of the French Navy to prevent their use by the Axis Powers. The Royal Navy′s Force H arrived off the French naval base at Mers El Kébir near Oran in Algeria that day and demanded that the French Navy either turn over the ships based there to British custody or disable them. When the French refused, the British warships opened fire on the French ships in the harbor in the attack on Mers-el-Kébir. French forces at Casablanca were placed on alert that day, and the submarines , Amazone, and  put to sea to patrol off Casablanca. On 5 July, Orphée got underway to relieve Ajax and Persée on patrol. The alert status ended on 18 July 1940 in the interest of reducing the wear on French submarines and demands on their crews. Tensions again increased at Casablanca on 21 July 1940 when the French Air Force flew a reconnaissance mission over Gibraltar, but relaxed a few hours later.

Orphée became flagship of the 13th Submarine Division in September 1940, and continued to operate from Casablanca during 1940, 1941, and 1942. In March 1942 she was reassigned to the new 18th Submarine Division at Casbalanca.

On 8 November 1942, Allied forces invaded French North Africa in Operation Torch. Orphée sortied at 05:33 to patrol off Casablanca with Amazone, Antiope, Méduse, and Sibylle, assigned a patrol area bearing between 85 and 120 degrees from El Hank on the coast of French Morocco. As the Naval Battle of Casablanca raged between United States Navy and Vichy French forces, she sighted several Allied ships on 8 and 9 November 1942, but was unable to attack any of them. French naval authorities recalled her to Casablanca on 9 November 1942. She arrived there at 01:30 on 10 November 1942, moored next to the destroyer , and took on supplies. She got back underway at 03:00 bound for Dakar in Senegal, but during the day on 10 November French resistance to the Allied invasion ended, and she again was recalled. She arrived at Casablanca at midnight.

Free French Naval Forces

After the end of hostilities between French and Allied forces in French North Africa, Orphée joined the Free French Naval Forces. In mid-December 1942, she and the submarine  began service as training ships.

Orphée later returned to combat duties. On 8 August 1943, she made an unsuccessful attempt to land an agent at San Stefano near Anzio on the coast of Italy. Operating from the submarine base at Oran in November 1943, she landed five agents on the coast of Spain at Barcelona on 20 November. It was the first time during World War II that a French submarine sank a ship in the Mediterranean Sea. She visited Barcelona again on 28 December 1943, landing four agents and picking up one, and her submarine division awarded her a citation of the order on 31 December 1943.

On 25 January 1944, Orphée landed six agents at Barcelona and picked up three. On 22 February 1944, she returned to Barcelona, where she landed seven more agents and picked up two. On 1 March 1944, she landed four agents at Barcelona. At 13:53 on 2 March 1944, she fired a torpedo at the Spanish steam cargo ship  near Barcelona.

In September 1944, the Free French Naval Forces made plans to place Orphée in special reserve. In August 1945, when World War II came to an end with the cessation of hostilities between the Allies and Japan, she still was part of the Oran Submarine Group.

Post-World War II

On 16 October 1945, Orphée collided with the Spanish fishing trawler José Carmen. At 11:20 on 3 March 1946 she suffered an explosion while docked at Casablanca that killed two men and injured nine. The explosion was attributed to poor ventilation of her batteries. In April 1946, a request was made for recognition of members of Orphée′s crew who particularly distinguished themselves in responding to the accident.

Final disposition
Orphée was condemned on 26 March 1946 and disarmed in April 1946.

Honors and awards
 Croix de Guerre 1939–1945, awarded 23 August 1946

References

Citations

Bibliography
 .
 .
 .
 .
 .
 .

External links
 .
 .
 .
 .
 .

Diane-class submarine (1930)
1931 ships
Ships built in France
World War II submarines of France
Maritime incidents in October 1945
Maritime incidents in 1946
French submarine accidents